Dover is a local government district in Kent, England. The port town of Dover is its administrative centre. It was formed on 1 April 1974 by the merger of the boroughs of Deal, Dover, and Sandwich along with Dover Rural District and most of Eastry Rural District.

Settlements
There are three towns within the district: Deal, Dover and Sandwich; and the parishes below:

 Alkham
 Ash
 Aylesham
 Capel-le-Ferne
 Denton with Wootton
 Eastry
 Eythorne
 Goodnestone
 Great Mongeham
 Guston
 Hougham Without
 Langdon
 Lydden
 Nonington
 Northbourne
 Preston
 Ringwould with Kingsdown
 Ripple
 River
 Shepherdswell with Coldred
 Sholden
 St Margaret's at Cliffe
 Staple
 Stourmouth
 Sutton
 Temple Ewell
 Tilmanstone
 Walmer
 Whitfield
 Wingham
 Woodnesborough
 Worth

The northern boundary of the district is the River Stour; on its western side is the district of Canterbury; to the south the parish of Capel-le-Ferne; and to the east the Straits of Dover. The southern part of the latter is the point where the North Downs meets the sea, at the White Cliffs of Dover. Further north along the coast, from Deal onwards, the land is at sea level, where the River Stour enters the sea by a circuitous route. It is here, on the sand-dunes, that the Royal St George's Golf Club, founded in 1887, and of international repute, is situated.

In the district are industrial remains of the erstwhile Kent coalfield, situated around Tilmanstone and Betteshanger. Half of the underwater section of the Channel Tunnel is under British Sovereignty and thus part of the district.

Council 

The council has 32 members representing 17 wards.

Elections

Premises
The council's main offices are at the White Cliffs Business park in the parish of Whitfield, to the north of the town of Dover itself.

Communications
Deal Timeball is a Victorian maritime Greenwich Mean Time signal located on the roof of a waterfront four-storey tower. It was established in 1855 by the Astronomer Royal George Biddell Airy in collaboration with Charles V. Walker.

Crossing Dover district are the Roman roads of Watling Street and that leading from Richborough. Today the main road, the A2, closely follows Watling Street to Dover.

References

External links
 Dover District Council website
Parish listing
Deal High Street winner of the Telegraph's first High Street of the Year award
Kent coalfield history
Dover pictorial website
Dover Community Radio (DCR)

 
Non-metropolitan districts of Kent